Edie Kerouac-Parker (September 20, 1922 – October 29, 1993) was the author of the memoir You'll Be Okay, about her life with her first husband, Jack Kerouac, and the early days of the Beat Generation. While an art student under George Grosz at Barnard College, she and fellow Barnard student and friend Joan Vollmer shared an apartment on 118th Street in New York City which came to be frequented by many of the then unknown Beats, among them Vollmer's eventual husband William S. Burroughs, and fellow Columbia students Jack Kerouac and Allen Ginsberg as well as Lucien Carr.

Born in Detroit, Parker was raised in Grosse Pointe Park, Michigan. Edie and Jack were married on August 22, 1944 at Manhattan Municipal Building in downtown New York. At the time, Jack was in jail as an accessory after the fact in Lucien Carr's murder of David Kammerer. This event expedited their intention to marry as Jack's father, Leo, refused to bail him out of jail. Jack was released from jail long enough for him and Edie to be escorted downtown by two NYPD detectives to be married. Once married, Edie could access an inheritance from her grandfather's then-unprobated estate to post Kerouac's bail. The marriage was annulled in 1948.

Edie appears as Judie Smith in Kerouac's novel The Town and the City, Elly in Visions of Cody, Edna "Johnnie" Palmer of Vanity of Duluoz, and herself in "The Original Scroll" – the unedited edition of On the Road.  Edie was played by actress Elizabeth Olsen in the film Kill Your Darlings. Edie's memoir, You'll Be Okay – My Life with Jack Kerouac, was published posthumously in 2007 by City Lights.

References

1922 births
Place of death missing
1993 deaths
Writers from Detroit
Barnard College alumni
20th-century American writers
20th-century American women writers